Widlin Calixte (born 21 April 1990) is a Haiti-born footballer who plays as a midfielder for the Turks and Caicos Islands national football team.

International career
On 26 March 2015, he scored penalty kicks in the 4th and 14th minutes of a World Cup first qualifying round second leg against Saint Kitts and Nevis at the TCIFA National Academy in Providenciales. His team lost the match 2–6 and the tie 4–12 on aggregate.

International goals

|-
| 1. || rowspan="2"| 26 March 2015 || rowspan="2"| TCIFA National Academy, Providenciales, Turks and Caicos Islands || rowspan="2"|  ||  || rowspan="2"|  || rowspan="2"| 2018 FIFA World Cup qualification
|-
| 2. || 
|}

References

External links

 

1990 births
Living people
People from Cap-Haïtien
Haitian emigrants to the Turks and Caicos Islands
Naturalised citizens of the United Kingdom
Turks and Caicos Islands footballers
Association football midfielders
Turks and Caicos Islands international footballers
Turks and Caicos Islands people of Haitian descent
Sportspeople of Haitian descent